The cyber security (or information assurance) community in the United Kingdom is diverse, with many stakeholders groups contributing to support the UK Cyber Security Strategy. The following is a list of some of these stakeholders.

Government 

According to a parliamentary committee the UK government is not doing enough to protect the nation against cyber attack.

Cyber Aware 
Cyber Aware is a cross-government awareness and behaviour campaign which provides advice on the simple measures individuals can take to protect themselves from cyber crime.

Department for Digital, Culture, Media and Sport 
The Department for Digital, Culture, Media and Sport is one of the lead government departments on cyber security policy, responsible for supporting & promoting the UK cyber security sector, promoting cyber security research and innovation, and working with the National Cyber Security Centre to help ensure all UK organisations are secure online and resilient to cyber threats.

Get Safe Online 
Get Safe Online is a United Kingdom-based campaign and national initiative to teach citizens about basic computer security and internet privacy.

National Crime Agency (NCA) 
The National Crime Agency (NCA) hosts the law enforcement cyber crime unit, incorporating the Child Exploitation and Online Protection Centre.

National Cyber Force (NCF) 

The National Cyber Force consolidates offensive cyber capabilities from the Ministry of Defence and GCHQ.

National Cyber Security Centre 

The National Cyber Security Centre is the UK’s authority on cyber security; its parent organisation is GCHQ. It absorbed and replaced CESG (the information security arm of GCHQ) as well as the Centre for Cyber Assessment (CCA), Computer Emergency Response Team UK (CERT UK) and the cyber-related responsibilities of the Centre for the Protection of National Infrastructure (CPNI). NCSC provides advice and support for the public and private sector in how to avoid cyber threats.

CESG (originally Communications-Electronics Security Group) was a branch of GCHQ which worked to secure the communications and information systems of the government and critical parts of UK national infrastructure. The Centre for the Protection of National Infrastructure (CPNI) provided protective security advice to businesses and organisations across the national infrastructure.

National Security Council 
The National Security Council is a Cabinet committee tasked with overseeing all issues related to national security, intelligence coordination, and defence strategy.

Office of Cyber Security and Information Assurance 

The Office of Cyber Security and Information Assurance (OCSIA) supports the Minister for the Cabinet Office, the Rt Hon Francis Maude MP and the National Security Council in determining priorities in relation to securing cyberspace. The unit provides strategic direction and coordinates action relating to enhancing cyber security and information assurance in the UK.  The OCSIA is headed by James Quinault.

Trustworthy Software Initiative 
The Trustworthy Software Initiative (TSI) is a UK public good activity, sponsored by the UK government's Centre for the Protection of National Infrastructure, aimed at 'making software better'.

Warning, Advice and Reporting Points (WARPs) 
Warning, Advice and Reporting Points (WARPs) provide a trusted environment where members of a community can share problems and solutions.

Professional bodies and industry groups

UK Cyber Security Forum 
The UK Cyber Security Forum is a social enterprise representing cyber SME's (Small and Medium Enterprise) in the UK.  The forum is composed of 20 regional cyber clusters around the UK.  Each cluster is run as a subsidiary of the UK Cyber Security Forum and all are operated by groups of volunteers.  They provide events around the UK to engage the public in cyber security and to provide continued professional development to cyber professionals. The official clusters are:

ADS
ADS is a trade organisation for companies operating in the UK aerospace, defence, security and space industries.

Business Continuity Institute (BCI) 
The Business Continuity Institute (BCI) was established in 1994 to enable individual members to obtain guidance and support from fellow business continuity practitioners. BCI has a six certification standards to ensure individual practitioners literacy in organizations, responses, and other strategies.

Council of Registered Ethical Security Testers (CREST) 
Not for profit accreditation and certification organization. CREST does not have its own study material and leverage on 3rd party coursework so that the member can become certified. As of 24/8/2022, the cost of CREST membership is 5000GBP for Membership of one country Chapter and 25000GBP for a regional membership. On two occasions between 2012 and 2014, the examination-related activities of one of more NCC Group employees and candidates breached the CREST Code of Conduct and NCC Group was, as their employer, vicariously responsible for those individuals at the time

Crypto Developers Forum

The CDF promotes the global interests of the UK crypto development industry.

Information Assurance Advisory Council (IAAC)

The Information Assurance Advisory Council (IAAC) works across industry, government and academia towards ensuring the UK’s information society has a robust, resilient and secure foundation. The IAAC was set up by Baroness Neville-Jones who chaired the organisation until 2007, handing over to the current chairman Sir Edmund Burton. Affiliates include BT Group, Northrop Grumman, QinetiQ, Raytheon, PwC, O2 UK, Ultra Electronics and GlaxoSmithKline. The 2012/13 work programme focused on consumerisation and its effects on information assurance.

Information Assurance Collaboration Group (IACG)

The IACG was formed following the UK's national IA conference in 2006.  The IACG encourages greater collaboration between the commercial supply base for information assurance products and services operating within the UK public sector.  Stakeholders include CESG, BIS, the Office of Cyber Security and Information Assurance (OCSIA), Cyber Security Operations Centre (CSOC), and the CPNI.  The group maintains the UK information assurance community map, hosted on the CESG's web site. It has two co-chairs: Colin Robbins of Nexor and Ross Parsell of Thales.  The IACG ceased operation in 2014.

Information Systems Security Association (ISSA) 
The Information Systems Security Association (ISSA) is a not-for-profit, international professional organization of information security professionals and practitioners. There is a UK chapter.

Institute of Information Security Professionals (IISP) 
The Institute of Information Security Professionals (IISP) is an independent, non-profit body governed by its members, with the principal objective of advancing the professionalism of information security practitioners and thereby the professionalism of the industry as a whole.

ISACA 
ISACA is an international professional association that deals with IT governance. Previously known as the Information Systems Audit and Control Association.

(ISC)² 
(ISC)² is the International Information Systems Security Certification Consortium is a non-profit organization which specializes in information security education and certifications.

NDI UK
NDI is a former government-funded organisation building supply chains for the MOD and manufacturers using SMEs in the United Kingdom.

TechUK

TechUK, formerly known as Intellect, is a UK trade association for the technology industry. It has a Cyber Security Group focused on “high threat” areas – including defence, national security and resilience, protection of critical national infrastructure, intelligence, and organised crime, chaired by Dr Andrew Rogoyski of Roke Manor Research. The Security and Resilience Group works to build relationships between the technology industry and policymakers, customers and end users, and is chaired by Stephen Kingan of Nexor.

Tigerscheme 
Tigerscheme is a commercial certification scheme for technical security specialists, backed by university standards and covering a wide range of expertise.

Tigerscheme is CESG certified in the UK and candidates are subject to an independent rigorous academic assessment authority. Tigerscheme was founded in 2007 on the principle that a commercial certification scheme run on independent lines would give buyers of security testing services confidence that they were hiring a recognised and reputable company. In June 2014 the operational authority for Tigerscheme was transferred to USW Commercial Services Ltd.

UK Cloud Pooled Audit Group (UK CPAG)
UK CPAG is a membership organisation consisting of the UK's largest banks. Established in 2020 with a mission to use the collective power of the banks to audit Cloud Service Providers such as Google, Amazon and Microsoft.  The group is operated by the Worshipful Company of Information Technologists

UK Council for Electronic Business

UKCeB is a not-for-profit, membership organisation whose mission is to transform secure information sharing for through life collaboration in defence acquisition and support.

British Computer Society (BCS) 
The British Computer Society (BCS) is a professional body and a learned society that represents those working in information technology both in the United Kingdom and internationally.  It has a security, data and privacy group.

Cyber Scheme 
The Cyber Scheme is a not for profit professional examination body under contract to the National Cyber Security Centre to provide technical exams in support of the Governments assured Penetration testing company scheme CHECK.   The exams are independent and rigorous and are conducted for Practitioner Team member level  and Team leader levels.

Association of Cyber Forensics and Threat Investigators (ACFTI) 
The Association of Cyber Forensics and Threat Investigators (ACFTI) is a not-for-profit, international professional organization focusing on the academics and research of cybersecurity, digital forensics, incident response, and threat investigations and their influence to the society. The vision of the Association is to promote research and education in cybersecurity, digital forensics, incident response, and threat investigations fields and to contribute to the creation and dissemination of knowledge and technology in these domains.

Academic

Academic Centres of Excellence in Cyber Security Research 
NCSC has accredited several Academic Centres of Excellence in Cyber Security Research:
 Queen's University Belfast
 University of Birmingham
 University of Bristol
 University of Cambridge
 Cardiff University
 De Montfort University
 University of Edinburgh
 University of Kent
 King's College London
 Lancaster University
 Imperial College London
 University College London
 Royal Holloway, University of London
 Newcastle University
 Northumbria University
 University of Oxford
 University of Southampton
 University of Surrey
 University of Warwick

University of South Wales Information Security Research Group 
The Information Security Research Group (ISRG) at the University of South Wales is a multidisciplinary team of academics and industrial experts focusing upon cyber security.

In particular the group is focusing upon:
 Network security
 Intrusion detection and wireless security
 Penetration testing and vulnerability assessment
 Computer forensics and digital evidence visualisation
 Threat assessment and risk management

De Montfort University Cyber Security Centre 
The Cyber Security Centre (CSC) at De Montfort University is a multidisciplinary group of academics who focus on a wide variety of cyber security and digital forensics issues. The Centre's mission is to provide the full benefits to all of a safe, secure and resilient cyberspace.

See also
 British intelligence agencies

References 

Computer security organizations
Cybercrime in the United Kingdom
Internet in the United Kingdom